The 1980 Volvo International was a men's tennis tournament played on outdoor clay courts in North Conway, New Hampshire in the United States and was part of the 1980 Volvo Grand Prix. The tournament was held from July 27 through August 3, 1980. Jimmy Connors won the singles title.

Finals

Singles

 Jimmy Connors defeated  Eddie Dibbs 6–3, 5–7, 6–1
 It was Connors' 4th singles title of the year and the 83rd of his career.

Doubles

 Jimmy Connors /  Brian Gottfried defeated  Kevin Curren /  Steve Denton 7–6, 6–2
 It was Connors' 5th title of the year and the 82nd of his career. It was Gottfried's 6th title of the year and the 64th of his career.

References

External links
 ITF tournament edition details

 
Volvo International
Volvo International
Volvo International
Volvo International
Volvo International